Gregory Matveieff (25 October 1901 – 15 August 1965) was a British diver. He competed in the men's 3 metre springboard event at the 1924 Summer Olympics.

References

External links
 

1901 births
1965 deaths
British male divers
Olympic divers of Great Britain
Divers at the 1924 Summer Olympics
People from Westminster